"Vaina Loca" is a song by Puerto Rican singer Ozuna and Colombian singer Manuel Turizo. It was released by VP Records on June 28, 2018. It is the second single from Ozuna's second album Aura, released in August 2018.

Awards and nominations

Charts

Weekly charts

Year-end charts

Certifications

See also
List of Billboard number-one Latin songs of 2018

References

2018 singles
2018 songs
Ozuna (singer) songs
Manuel Turizo songs
Songs written by Ozuna (singer)
Reggaeton songs
Spanish-language songs